Copromorphidae, the "tropical fruitworm moths", is a family of insects in the lepidopteran order. These moths have broad, rounded forewings, and well-camouflaged scale patterns. Unlike Carposinidae the mouthparts include "labial palps" with the second rather than third segment the longest. With other unusual structural characteristics of the caterpillar and adult, it could represent the sister lineage of all other extant members of this superfamily (Dugdale et al., 1999). The genus Sisyroxena from Madagascar is also notable for its unusual venation and wing scale sockets (Dugdale et al., 1999).

Etymology
The word Copromorphidae derives from the Ancient Greek words  meaning "excrement" and  meaning "shape" or "appearance", a reference to the visual characteristics of the moths' camouflage.

Distribution
These moths are widely distributed except the Palearctic region, occurring in Madagascar, India, South East Asia, New Guinea, Australia, New Zealand, the Neotropics, with limited temperate region coverage except that the genera Lotisma and Ellabella occur in North America, and the latter also in China (Common, 1990). Over 20 belong to the genus Copromorpha occurring in Indo-Australia (Dugdale et al., 1999).

Behaviour
Adults are night-flying and attracted to lights. Caterpillars live between joined leaves, flowers or fruits or bore within stems, and some eat leaves. The larvae pupate with the silken gallery or descend to the ground and make a cocoon covered in detritus (Dugdale et al., 1999).

Larval hostplants
Caterpillars feed on the families Ericaceae, Moraceae (Ficus) and Berberidaceae. The anomalous genus Isonomeutis is a predator on "scale insects" (Coccoidea; Margarodidae) (Dugdale et al., 1999) on the Podocarpaceae species Dacrydium cupressinum.

Fossils
One fossil taxon is known, Copromorpha fossilis Jarzembowski, 1980 from the "Bembridge Marls" of Isle of Wight, a rock formation of Oligocene age, about 35 million years old (Jarzembowski, 1980).

Genera
The position of the enigmatic New Zealand genus Isonomeutis in this family in uncertain, as it lacks the flimsy cuticle of the pupa characteristic of other Copromorphoidea.
Copromorpha Meyrick, 1886
=Trychnostola Turner, 1916
Aegidomorpha Meyrick, 1932
Cathelotis Meyrick, 1926
Dryanassa Meyrick, 1936
Ellabella Busck, 1925
=Probolacma Meyrick, 1927
=Spilogenes Meyrick, 1938
Endothamna Meyrick, 1922
Isonomeutis Meyrick, 1888
Lotisma Busck, 1909
Neophylarcha Meyrick, 1926
Ordrupia Busck, 1911
Osidryas Meyrick, 1916
=Heterocrita Turner, 1913
Phanerochersa Meyrick, 1926
Phycomorpha Meyrick, 1914
Rhopalosetia Meyrick, 1926
Rhynchoferella Strand, 1915
Saridacma Meyrick, 1930
Syncamaris Meyrick, 1932
Tanymecica Turner, 1916

Formerly placed here
Phaulophara Turner, 1916

References
Common, I.F.B. (1990). Moths of Australia. Brill Academic Publishers, Leiden. 535 pages.
Dugdale, J.S., Kristensen, N.P., Robinson, G.S. and Scoble, M.J. (1999). The smaller microlepidoptera grade superfamilies,  Ch.13., pp. 217–232 in Kristensen, N.P. (Ed.). Lepidoptera, Moths and Butterflies. Volume 1: Evolution, Systematics, and Biogeography. Handbuch der Zoologie. Eine Naturgeschichte der Stämme des Tierreiches / Handbook of Zoology. A Natural History of the phyla of the Animal Kingdom. Band / Volume IV Arthropoda: Insecta Teilband / Part 35: 491 pp. Walter de Gruyter, Berlin, New York.
Jarzembowski, E.A. (1980). Fossil, insects from the Bembridge Marls, Palaeogene of the Isle of Wight, southern England. Bulletin of the British Museum (Natural History) (Geology), 33: 237–293.
Nasu, Y., Saito, T, Furumi Komai, F. (2004). Discovery of the previously unrecorded family Copromorphidae Meyrick (Lepidoptera) in Japan, with description of a new species and autapomorphies for the family Entomological Science, 7 (1): 73–83.

External links
Tree of Life
NHM Hosts database
Australian Moths Online
Lepidoptera of Tasmania
New Zealand Fauna 

 
Copromorphoidea